Shiv Kumar Patel or Dadua (died 22 July 2007), was a notorious criminal and dacoit who operated in ravines and forests on the borders between the Indian states of Uttar Pradesh and Madhya Pradesh.

Early years 
Shiv Kumar Patel or Dadua was born in Devkali village of Chitrakoot district to Ram Pyare Patel and Krishnawati Patel.

Dadua's first recorded instance of crime was the murder of Jagannath on 16 May 1978, . He was later arrested. He has been called as a revolutionary and Robinhood by People. His temple has been built in 2016 at Dhata town, Fatehpur district.

He had been a member of the Seetharam gang since 1975.

Rise to infamy 
After his release, Dadua joined the ranks of Raja Ragoli, where he learned the trade from Gaya Kurmi, the gang's co-leader, who is regarded as a major factor behind Dadua's rise.

In 1983, Raja was killed and Gaya Kurmi surrendered, leaving the gang jointly headed by Suraj Bhan and Dadua. Suraj Bhan was arrested a year later and Dadua formed his own gang at the insistence of Gaya Kurmi.

Dadua led the massacre in Ramu ka Purwa where he executed nine people on 20 June 1986; he suspected one of the victims, Shambhu Singh, to be a police informer.

Dadua's gang include headmen in as many as 500 villages, and his influence extended to 10 assembly segments. In the years before his death he tried to bring his family into mainstream politics. 

He came to known as "Veerappan of Bundelkhand" and became the identity of terror in the region.

Family 
At the time of his death, his son Veer Singh Patel was the chairman of the Karwi panchayat and later became member (MLA) of Uttar Pradesh Vidhan Sabha from Chitrakoot (2012-2017). His daughter Chirunji Devi Patel (Block pramukh Dhata, Fatehpur district).

Dadua's brother Bal Kumar Patel  has served as Lok Sabha MP of Mirzapur (2009-2014). His nephew Ram Singh Patel is member (MLA) of Uttar Pradesh Vidhan Sabha from Patti (2022-Present).

Death 
Dadua was shot along with several gang members in a fight with Special Task Force (STF) of the Uttar Pradesh Police in Ailaha village near Manikpur (Chitrakoot district) on 22 July 2007.

The SIT was led by IPS officer Amitabh Yash (then SSP) and Anant Deo Tiwari (then Additional SP).

References 

2007 deaths
Indian robbers
Year of birth missing
Criminals from Uttar Pradesh
People shot dead by law enforcement officers in India